The Red Sea Egyptian Challenge was a golf tournament on the Challenge Tour. It was played in April 2016 at Sokhna Golf Club in Ain Sukhna, Suez, Egypt.

Winners

References

External links
Coverage on the Challenge Tour's official site

Former Challenge Tour events
Golf tournaments in Egypt
Recurring sporting events established in 2016
2016 establishments in Egypt